Sitayeb Mohamed Nazim Belguendouz  (born April 29, 1991) is a Canadian soccer midfielder who plays for CS Mont-Royal Outremont and the Canada national futsal team.

Early life
Belguendouz was born in Athens, Greece to Algerian parents and moved to Canada when he was 3. He began playing youth soccer with Lakers du Lac Saint-Louis.

Career

University
In 2010, he began playing university soccer with the Montreal Carabins.
In 2019, he returned to university soccer with the UQAM Citadins.

Club
In 2012, he played with FC Brossard in the Première ligue de soccer du Québec.

In 2013, he joined CS Mont-Royal Outremont, helping them win the league and cup double that season.

After the 2013 season, Mont-Royal Outremont got in contact with Major League Soccer club Montreal Impact and arranged for him to have a three-day trial with the Montreal Impact Academy. He had a successful trial and joined the Montreal Impact U23 team in the Premier Development League, serving as the team's co-captain. The following season, he joined the club's new professional second team, FC Montreal, in the USL serving as team captain. In March 2015, he made his debut as a starter in FC Montreal's inaugural match, a 2–0 loss to Toronto FC II.

In 2016, he returned to CS Mont-Royal Outremont.

Late in the 2016 season, he obtained his release from Mont-Royal Outremont and joined AS Blainville, staying with the club through 2018. In 2018, he scored against Dynamo de Québec to clinch the league title in a row for Blainville.

For the 2019 season, he once again returned to CS Mont-Royal Outremont. After the season, he re-signed with the club.

International career
Belguendouz has been a member of the Canada national futsal team since 2016. In 2017, he was named the first ever Canadian Futsal player of the year by the Canadian Soccer Association.

In 2017, he was part of the Canada national beach soccer team.

Career statistics

References

External links
 
 

1991 births
Living people
Association football midfielders
Algerian footballers
Canadian soccer players
Canadian beach soccer players
Canadian men's futsal players
Footballers from Athens
Greek footballers
Soccer players from Montreal
Algerian emigrants to Canada
Naturalized citizens of Canada
Montreal Impact U23 players
FC Montreal players
USL League Two players
USL Championship players
Première ligue de soccer du Québec players
FC Brossard players
Lakers du Lac Saint-Louis players
CS Mont-Royal Outremont players
A.S. Blainville players